The R.33 class of British rigid airships were built for the Royal Naval Air Service during the First World War, but were not completed until after the end of hostilities, by which time the RNAS had become part of the Royal Air Force. The lead ship, R.33, served successfully for ten years and survived one of the most alarming and heroic incidents in airship history when she was torn from her mooring mast in a gale. She was called a "Pulham Pig" by the locals, as the blimps based there had been, and is immortalised in the village sign for Pulham St Mary. The only other airship in the class, R.34, became the first aircraft to make an east to west transatlantic flight in July 1919 and, with the return flight, made the first two-way crossing. It was decommissioned two years later, after being damaged during a storm. The crew nicknamed her "Tiny".

Design and development
Substantially larger than the preceding R31 class, the R.33 class was in the design stage in 1916 when the German Zeppelin LZ 76 (L 33) was brought down on English soil. Despite the efforts of the crew to set it on fire, it was captured nearly intact, with engines in working order. For five months, the LZ 76 was carefully examined in order to discover the Germans' secrets.

The existing design was adapted to produce a new airship based on the German craft and two examples were ordered, one (R.33) to be constructed by Armstrong-Whitworth at Barlow, North Yorkshire, and the other (R.34) by William Beardmore and Company in Inchinnan, Renfrewshire, Scotland. Assembly began in 1918. The R.33 class was semi-streamlined fore and aft, the middle section being straight-sided. The control car was well forward on the ship, with the aft section containing an engine in a separate structure to stop vibrations affecting the sensitive radio direction finding and communication equipment. The small gap was faired over, so the gondola seemed to be a single structure. It was powered by five  Sunbeam Maori engines, with one in the aft section of the control car, two more in a pair of power cars amidships each driving a pusher propeller via a reversing gearbox for manoeuvering while mooring, and the remaining two in a centrally mounted aft car, geared together to drive a single pusher propeller.

Operational history

R.33

R.33 first flew on 6 March 1919, and was sent to RAF Pulham in Norfolk. Between then and 14 October, R.33 made 23 flights totalling 337 hours flying time. One of these, a flight promoting "Victory Bonds" even included a brass band playing in the top machine gun post.

In 1920 she was "demilitarised" and given over to civilian work with the civil registration G-FAAG. This work consisted of trials of new mast mooring techniques using the mast erected at Pulham. Another experiment was an ascent carrying a pilotless Sopwith Camel which was successfully launched over the Yorkshire Moors. After an overhaul, R33 was based at Croydon Airport, moored to a portable mast. In June 1921 it was used by the Metropolitan Police to observe traffic at The Derby, and in July she appeared in the Hendon Air Pageant before flying to Cardington, Bedfordshire, where she was laid up for three years.

On 31 May 1921 the British government cancelled all airship development for financial reasons. Military airships were scrapped, but as a civilian airship R.33 was mothballed instead. In 1925, after being inactive for nearly four years, the reconditioned R.33 emerged from her shed at Cardington.

At 09:50 on 16 April 1925 the R.33 was torn from the mast at Pulham during a gale and was carried away with only a partial crew of 20 men on board. Her nose partially collapsed and the first gas cell deflated leaving her low in the bow. The crew on board started the engines, gaining some height, and rigged a cover for the bow section, but the R.33 was blown out over the North Sea. A Royal Navy vessel was readied and left the nearby port of Lowestoft in case the R.33 came down in the sea. The local lifeboat was launched, but was driven back by the weather conditions.

Some five hours after the initial break from the mast, R.33 was under control but still being blown towards the Continent. As she approached the Dutch coast R.33 was given the option of landing at De Kooy, where a party of 300 men was standing by. Late in the evening R.33 was able to hold her position over the Dutch coast, hovering there until 5 o'clock the next morning. She was then able to slowly make her way back home, arriving at the Suffolk coast eight hours later and reaching Pulham at 13:50 hrs, where she was put into the shed alongside the R36.

For their actions the airship's first officer, who had been in command, Lieutenant Ralph Booth was awarded the Air Force Cross, the coxswain, Flight-Sergeant "Sky" Hunt, was awarded the Air Force Medal, four other crew members were awarded the British Empire Medal and the other crew members were presented with inscribed watches.

In October 1925, following repairs, she was used for experiments to provide data for the construction of the R101 airship. Once these were finished, in mid-October, she was used for trials launching a parasite fighter, using a DH 53 Hummingbird light aircraft. After some near misses, a successful launch and recapture was achieved in December that year. The following year she launched a pair of Gloster Grebes weighing about a ton apiece, the first of which was flown by Flying Officer Campbell MacKenzie-Richards. She was then sent to the sheds at Pulham where she was finally broken up in 1928, after severe metal fatigue was found in her frame. The forward portion of R.33's control car is on display at the RAF Museum at Hendon.

R.34
R.34 made her first flight on 14 March 1919 and was delivered to her service base at RAF East Fortune near Edinburgh on 29 May after a 21-hour flight from Inchinnan. R.34 had set out the previous evening, but thick fog made navigation difficult, and after spending the night over the North Sea the airship was unable to moor in the morning due to fog. After cruising as far south as Yorkshire R.34 returned to East Fortune to dock at about 3 p.m. The airship made her first endurance trip of 56 hours over the Baltic from 17 to 20 June.

It was then decided to attempt the first return Atlantic crossing, under the command of Major George Scott. R.34 had never been intended as a passenger carrier and extra accommodation was arranged by slinging hammocks in the keel walkway. A plate was welded to an engine exhaust pipe to allow for the preparation of hot food.

The crew included Brigadier-General Edward Maitland and Zachary Lansdowne as the representative of the US Navy. William Ballantyne, one of the crew members scheduled to stay behind to save weight, stowed away with the crew's mascot, a small tabby kitten called "Wopsie"; they emerged at 2.00 p.m. on the first day, too late to be dropped off.

R.34 left East Fortune, Scotland, on 2 July 1919 and arrived at Mineola, Long Island, United States, on 6 July after a flight of 108 hours with virtually no fuel left. As the landing party had no experience of handling large rigid airships, Major E. M. Pritchard jumped by parachute and so became the first person to reach American soil by air from Europe. This was the first East-West aerial crossing of the Atlantic and was achieved weeks after the first transatlantic aeroplane flight by British aviators Captain John Alcock and Lieutenant Arthur Whitten Brown in a modified First World War Vickers Vimy. The return journey to RNAS Pulham took place from 10 to 13 July and took 75 hours. Returned to East Fortune for a refit, R.34 then flew to Howden, East Yorkshire, for crew training.

On 27 January 1921 R.34 set off on what should have been a routine exercise. Over the North Sea the weather worsened and a recall signal sent by radio was not received. Following a navigational error the craft flew into a hillside on the North Yorkshire Moors during the night, and the ship lost two propellers. She went back out to sea using the two remaining engines and in daylight followed the Humber Estuary back to Howden. Strong winds made it impossible to get her back into the shed, and she was tied down outside for the night. By the morning further damage had occurred and R.34 was written off and scrapped.

Operators

Royal Navy (to 1918)
Royal Air Force (from 1918)

Specifications

See also

Walter Wellman

Notes

Bibliography
 Abbott, Patrick. Airship the Story of R.34 and the First East-West Crossing of the Atlantic By Air. Encore Editions, 1977. .

 Griehl, Manfred and Dressel, Joachim. Zeppelin! The German Airship Story. London, Arms and Armour Press, 1990. .
 Higham, Robin. The British Rigid Airship 1908–1931. Henley-on-Thames: Foulis, 1961.
 Maitland, E.M. The Log of HMA R34 - Journey to America and Back. Centenary Edition, Pennoyer Centre, 2019. .
 Mowthorpe, Ces. Battlebags: British Airships of the First World War. 1995. .
 Rosie, George. Flight of the Titan: The Story of the R34. Birlinn Ltd, 2010. .
 Venty, Arthur Frederick and Eugene M. Kolesnik. Airship Saga: The History of Airships Seen Through the Eyes of the Men Who Designed, Built, and Flew Them. Poole, Dorset, UK: Blandford Press, 1982. .
 Venty, Arthur Frederick and Eugene M. Kolesnik. Jane's Pocket Book of Airships. New York: Collier Books, 1976. .

External links

 Airship Heritage Trust R33 Page
 R34 – The Record Breaker – The Airship Heritage Trust
 The Return Voyage of R 34 Flight 17 July 1919.
 Airships at Pulham

1910s British patrol aircraft
Airships of the United Kingdom
Hydrogen airships
Rigid airships
Aircraft first flown in 1919